FF Andromedae (often abbreviated to FF And) is a spectroscopic binary in the constellation Andromeda. It has a typical apparent visual magnitude of 10.4, but undergoes flare events that can increase its brightness by about a magnitude.

System
Both stars in the FF Andromedae system are main sequence red dwarfs of spectral type M1Ve, meaning that the spectrum shows strong emission lines. The lines identified are H-alpha and CaII. They have a total mass of 1.10  and both are tidally locked, thus their rotation period is equal to the orbital period of 2.17 days.

The secondary component should not be confused with the 13th magnitude star listed in the Washington Double Star Catalog as WDS J00428+3533B and sometimes referred to as GJ 29.1B, which is just a line-of-sight giant star much more distant than FF Andromedae.  The designation GJ 29.1B is also applied to the secondary red dwarf in the close spectroscopic binary.

Variability
FF Andromedae shows a regular variability within a rotation period, typical of BY Draconis variable stars, but occasionally increases its brightness in a stellar flare. Small amplitude variations, at timescales of several minutes, were also reported during the quiescent phase. Small, but highly significant dips in the light curve have been detected approximately 25 minutes before a large flare.

References

Andromeda (constellation)
Andromedae, FF
J00424820+3532554
003362
Gliese and GJ objects
Spectroscopic binaries
Flare stars
BY Draconis variables
M-type main-sequence stars
Emission-line stars